De Bruin is a Dutch surname meaning "the brown" or "the brown one". It is  common in the Netherlands (17,650 people in 2007). People named "de Bruin" include:

Christiaan de Bruin (b. 1993), South African rugby player
Christine de Bruin (b. 1989), Canadian bobsledder.
Corrie de Bruin (b. 1976), Dutch discus thrower and shot putter
Erik de Bruin (b. 1963), Dutch discus thrower and shot putter
Eugene DeBruin (1933–c.1968), American Air Force pilot and Vietnam POW
Hugo de Bruin (b. c.1960), Dutch rock guitarist
 (1620–1675), Dutch philosopher, physicist and mathematic
Leana de Bruin (b. 1977), South African netball player
Liesbeth de Bruin (b. 1946), Dutch rower
Luan de Bruin (b. 1993), South African rugby player
Michelle de Bruin (b. 1967), British sculptor
Michelle Smith de Bruin (b. 1969), Irish swimmer
Monique de Bruin (born 1965), Dutch cyclist
Monique de Bruin (born 1977), American fencer
Petra de Bruin (b. 1962), Dutch cyclist
Swys de Bruin (b. 1960), South African rugby coach
De Bruine
Jan de Bruine (1903–1983), Dutch equestrian

See also
 Bruin (surname)
 De Bruijn
 De Bruyn
 De Bruyne

References

Dutch-language surnames